Berryessa Snow Mountain National Monument is a national monument of the United States comprising  of the California Coast Ranges in Napa, Yolo, Solano, Lake, Colusa, Glenn and Mendocino counties in northern California. Cache Creek Wilderness is located within the monument.

Creation
The national monument was created by a proclamation issued on July 10, 2015 by President Barack Obama under the Antiquities Act. Obama also signed proclamations creating two other national monuments (the Basin and Range National Monument in Nevada and the Waco Mammoth National Monument in central Texas) the same day. The monument will be jointly managed by the Mendocino National Forest of the U.S. Forest Service and the Bureau of Land Management

The proclamation of Berryessa Snow Mountain National Monument came after a campaign for the area's designation, supported by a coalition of counties and cities in the region (many of which passed resolutions of support), the California State Legislature, the Elem Indian Colony of Pomo Indians, state and local political leaders, local newspaper editorial boards, conservationist and environmental organizations, recreation groups, local business owners and landowners.

Description
The monument includes the Snow Mountain, Cache Creek and the Cedar Roughs Wilderness areas. The monument, along with the lake, take their name from the Berryessa family of California, a historically prominent Californio family of the Bay Area.

Lake Berryessa itself was not included within the monument's boundaries due to critics' concerns over the possibility that the use of motorized boats, watercraft and Jet Skis could be restricted at some point in the future.

Ecology
Wildlife in the region includes bald eagles, golden eagles, black bears, mountain lions, tule elk, black-tailed deer, northern spotted owl, marten, fisher, California Coastal chinook salmon, and Northern California steelhead.  The area is also home to some of the world's rare plants, described as "particularly delicate serpentine plants clinging to otherwise barren and rocky mountainsides." The high-elevation Snow Mountain area is one of the most biologically diverse regions in California.

Native American history
The area has cultural and historical, as well as ecological, significance. The region has been inhabited by linguistically diverse Native American tribes for 11,000 years — including the Yuki, Nomlaki, Patwin, Pomo, Huchnom, Wappo, Lake Miwok and Wintum indigenous peoples.

See also
Blue Ridge Berryessa Natural Area
List of national monuments of the United States

References

External links
U.S. Forest Service: official Berryessa Snow Mountain National Monument website
 BLM: official Berryessa Snow Mountain National Monument website
Tuleyome: non-profit conservation organization for Berryessa Snow Mountain National Monument

 
National Monuments in California
Bureau of Land Management National Monuments
United States Forest Service National Monuments
California Coast Ranges
Mendocino National Forest
Bureau of Land Management areas in California
Parks in Glenn County, California
Parks in Lake County, California
Parks in Mendocino County, California
Parks in Napa County, California
Parks in Solano County, California
Protected areas of Colusa County, California
Protected areas of Yolo County, California
National Monuments designated by Barack Obama
Protected areas established in 2015
2015 establishments in California